Military Technical Institute (abbr. )  is a Serbian weapons and aircraft design institute, headquartered in Belgrade, and governed by the Serbian Ministry of Defence. It is a top-level military scientific research institution in Serbia, dealing with research and development (R&D) of new weaponry and military equipment as well as with upgrade of the inventory for both branches of the Serbian Armed Forces: Army (including River Flotilla) and Air Force and Defence.

Institute history
After the World War II, Federal People's Republic of Yugoslavia had a need to independently develop military technology and reduce dependence from foreign supply with given political situation of that time and future political course. By a decision of the Secretary of Defense and a proclamation by the Yugoslav president Josip Broz Tito, VTI was founded in 1948 as the Military Technical Institute of the Land Forces (abbr. ) in Belgrade.

In 1973, the VTI was integrated with several smaller military research and development institutes.

In 1992 it assimilated the dissolved Aeronautical Technical Institute in Žarkovo, and minor parts (located in Serbia) of the Nautical Institute from Zagreb, supposedly as an effort to reduce developing cost and maintenance. Since 1992 the institute has changed name several times, reflecting the political changes in the country, starting with Technical Institute of the Yugoslav Armed Forces.

Current name is Military Technical Institute. Neither the translation of the name to other languages nor the corresponding acronym have ever been unambiguously defined;  both VTI and MTI have been used in English-language documents, against the widely accepted practice not to translate such acronymes.

Today
The institute has 22 laboratories, and it is situated on 212 acres (86 hectares), with 177,000 square meters laboratories and office space, mostly in Belgrade neighborhood of Žarkovo, on the premises of the former Aeronautical Technical Institute. The institute obtained the certificates of compliance to the SRPS ISO 9001 and SRPS ISO/IEC 17025 standards.

Projects
The institute cooperates with Serbian Armed Forces (including its Technical Testing Center) and Yugoimport SDPR in designing and testing new weapons systems.

Military Technical Institute (with assimilated predecessor institutes) developed more than 1,300 weapons. However, not all of them entered use in the Yugoslav (later Serbian) Army. 
The list includes weapons and systems of other companies in which VTI was partly involved in some stage of developing and those systems are given with references. Institute was in charge for domestically produced weapons systems under licence and modification and modernization of such weapons with introducing new technologies and making new materials and tools for production. There are several new weapons developed from licences products that surpass originals in performance. Examples of licences used for domestic new weapons is a licence for tank T-72.

Aircraft

Ikarus S-49
Soko J-20 Kraguj
 Soko G-2 Galeb 
 Soko J-21 Jastreb 
 Soko J-22 Orao 
 Soko G-4 Super Galeb
 UTVA 75 
(above mentioned developed by the Aeronautical Technical Institute)
 Kobac
 Lasta 95
HN-45M Gama
HN-45M Gama 2

Unmanned Aerial Vehicles

 Vrabac 
 Pegaz 011
 IBL-2000

Unmanned Ground Vehicles

 Mali Miloš

Armoured Vehicles

Tanks 

 M-84 and A/AB/ABN/ABK/AS variants (1985–present)
 M-84A – An upgraded version similar to the Soviet T-72M1 but with a significantly more powerful engine and additional armour plating
 M-84AB – Kuwaiti version of the M-84A
 M-84AB – The M-84AB fitted with land navigation equipment
 M-84ABK Command Tank – M-84AB version fitted with extensive communication equipment, land navigation equipment, and a generator for the command role
 M-84AI armored recovery vehicle (Yugoslavia and Poland) – During the mid-1990s Kuwait requested an armored recovery vehicle variant of the M-84A tank as part of the deal to buy a large batch of M-84A tanks.
 M-84AS – Upgrade package of the M-84A in service with the Serbian Army
 M-84AS1 – Adds additional armor, including explosive reactive armor, integrated day-night sighting system with thermal imager, command information system, a soft-kill active protection system, new radio system, remote-controlled weapons station with 12.7mm machine gun, and CBRN protection equipment

Infantry Fighting Vehicles 

 BVP M-80 (1979–present)
 M-80A – Improved version with 320 hp engine, full production
 M-80A1 or SPAT 30/2 – Improved version with a dual 30mm gun system called "Foka". Prototype only.
 M-80A/98 – Further improvements of M-80A1 with new "Vidra" turret
 M-80A KC – Company commander's vehicle
 M-80A KB – Battalion commander's vehicle
 M-80A VK - Turretless commander's vehicle
 M-80A Sn – Medical, no turret. Single oblong hatch in the roof and single rear door. Carries 4 stretcher patients or 8 seated patients.
 M-80A LT – Tank hunter with six AT-3 launchers
 Sava M-90 – SA-13 SAM version, designated Strela-10MJ, prototype
 MOS – Self-propelled mine layer
 M-80AK/M-98A – New gun turret with 30 mm M86 cannon or 30 mm dual feed M89 cannon
 M-80AB1 – Advanced armour, turret gun control equipment, optronics package, smoke grenade launchers and the ability to mount and launch the most recent 9M14 Malyutka missile variants

Armoured Personnel Carriers 

 OT M-60 (1962-1979)
 BOV 4 x 4 (1980–present)
 BOV VP
 BOV M11
 BOV M15
 BOV APC

Reconnaissance Vehicles 

BOV M11
 Kurjak

Air Defence Vehicles 

 BOV 3
 BOV 30
 BOV AX Hybrid

Engineering Vehicles 

VIU-55 Munja (T-55 conversion)
 M-84AI

Artillery

Field artillery

 Nora M-84
 M-56

Self-propelled artillery

 Nora B-52 
 Sora 122mm

Multiple rocket launcher

 LRSVM Morava
 M-87 Orkan
 M-96 Orkan 2
 M-77 Oganj
 M-63 Plamen
 Nimr

Mortars

 M57 mortar
 Universal Mortar UB M52
 M74 light mortar
 M75 light mortar
 M95 mortar
 Mortar 60mm M70
 Mortar 60mm M95
 Mortar 60 mm M06C
 Mortar 82mm M69A

Anti-tank Weapons

 Bumbar 
 M79 Osa 
 M80 Zolja 
 M90 Stršljen
 M-80A LT 
 POLO M-83
 Malyutka-2T

Anti-Aircraft Weapons

 Sava M-90
 SPAT 30/2
 BOV-3
 BOV-30
 Strela 2M2J 
 Sava
 Strela-10M

Mines and Mine layers

 Self-Propelled Minelayer MOS
 TMA–4 
 TMRP–6

Military trucks

 FAP 1118 
 FAP 2026
 FAP 2228
 FAP 3232 
 FAP 3240 
 Zastava NTV

Turrets, cupolas and RCWS

 M91
 M86 
 M86/06 
 M10 RCWS 
 12,7mm RCWS
 M20 RCWS

Missiles

Unguided missiles

 M-77 
 Plamen A 
 Plamen D

Air-to-surface missile

 Grom A
 Grom B 
 LVBF-250

Surface to surface missiles

 Košava 1

Projectiles and large calibers ammunition

 105mm HE ER-BB M02
 105 mm HE ER 
 125mm APFSDS–T M88 
 155mm HEERFB–BB M03

Rifles, guns, sub-machine guns and snipers

 Zastava M21
 Zastava M97
 Zastava M97K
 Zastava M70

Radars

 PR15 
 Žirafa M-85

Electronics, optoelectronic stations, fuzes, homing heads, sensors, etc
MIP 11, TV Homing Heads for Guided missiles, Laser Homing Heads for Guided missiles, System for acoustic source localization - HEMERA, inertial guidance systems for missiles, Explosive reactive armour M99, Battery command and control system for Nora B-52, M07G Mortar ballistic computer, Tank engine protection from wrong start-up, system for automatic control and jamming of mobile telephony, Radio jammers against remotely controlled improvised explosive devices, Software packages for command and control of air defense assets from the command and control centers, MOMS surveillance-sighting system

Upgrades modernization and modifications
Neva-M1T, SA-341, Upgraded Howitzer 105 mm M56/33, Upgraded Howitzer 105mm M101/33, Programs for modernization of the T-55 family of tanks, including their Chinese derivatives, as well as of the T-72 family of tanks, Upgraded BTR-50

Specialized laboratories

 Aerodynamics 
 Spatial Forms and Lengths Measuring
 Experimental Modal Analysis, Vibration and Balancing Analysis
 Experimental Strength 
 Experimental Ballistics
 Testing of Solid Propellant Rocket Motors 
 Power-Generating Materials 
 Servo-Systems 
 Hardware in the Loop (HIL) Simulation and Telemetry
 Electro-Inertial Sensors 
 NBC Protection 
 Electromagnetic Compatibility
 Radio-Relay Systems and Multiplex Equipment 
 Micrography 
 Optoelectronics 
 Guidance and Control 
 Electric Power Devices

Fairs and scientific-technical gatherings 
Military Technical Institute regularly exhibits at Partner and IDEX military fairs as well as organizing OTEX scientific-technical gathering.

Technical cooperation
Military Technical Institute cooperates with following overhaul institutes:
Technical Overhaul Institute "Čačak" http://www.trzcacak.rs/en/index.html
Technical Overhaul Institute "Đurđe Dimitrijević-Đura"  http://www.trzk.co.rs/English/first.htm
Aeronautical Overhaul Institute "Moma Stanojlović"

Documentary and publishing activity

Making of technical documentation, films and books represents an important part of VTI as publisher, it represents institute output and quantifier of more than sixty years involvement in R&D missions. The institute possesses technical documentation for over 1300 items of weaponry and defense equipment developed through institute history that are introduced in service in the armed forces. This documentation being intellectual property of MoD, it has an outstanding value and use for future projects.

Media
Mali Miloš in action - story about development and use, presented by official Serbia RTS state defense TV channel "Dozvolite" - Little Milos - robot

See also
 Defense industry of Serbia

References

 
Aerospace companies of Serbia
Manufacturing companies established in 1948
Companies based in Belgrade
Ministry of Defence (Serbia)
Research institutes established in 1948
1948 establishments in Serbia
Defense industry of Serbia
Čukarica